Brad Lekkerkerker (born May 8, 1978, in Upland, California) is an offensive tackle who formerly played for the Oakland Raiders of the National Football League (NFL). He was originally acquired as a free agent in 2004 by the Houston Texans then was on and off the Oakland Raiders roster.  Lekkerkerker was allocated to NFL Europe in 2006 then placed on the Reserve/Retired List by the Raiders on July 26, 2006. He played collegiately at the University of California, Davis. Lekkerkerker is the older brother of free agent lineman Cory Lekkerkerker.

References

Living people
1978 births
People from Upland, California
American football offensive tackles
University of California, Davis alumni
UC Davis Aggies football players
Houston Texans players
Oakland Raiders players
Players of American football from California
Sportspeople from San Bernardino County, California